Amanda J. Barker is a Canadian comedic and dramatic actress. 

Amanda Barker was born in Hanover, Massachusetts and at the age of 13, moved to New Brunswick with her family. After high school, she studied English and Theater at Mount Allison University. She moved to Toronto and began working as major league baseball's only female mascot, Diamond, with the Toronto Blue Jays until she left to join the Second City National Touring Company. In 2012, she was a writer and star in the hit show Release the Stars: The Ballad of Randy and Evi Quaid at the Toronto fringe festival.

Recent television credits include Video on Trial, The Jon Dore Show, and Separation.  In 2013, she starred as EBJ in Spank! The Fifty Shades Parody.

References

External links

Canadian film actresses
Canadian television actresses
Living people
Year of birth missing (living people)
People from Hanover, Massachusetts
Actresses from Massachusetts
Actresses from New Brunswick
Mount Allison University alumni
21st-century Canadian actresses
21st-century American women